This is a list of the largest deserts in the world by area. It includes all deserts above .

Notes

See also 
 Desert
 Desertification
 List of deserts by continent
 Polar desert
 Tundra
 United Nations Convention to Combat Desertification

References 

Deserts By Area

Deserts by area

Deserts